Triplophysa labiata, the Plain Thicklip Loach, is a species of ray-finned fish in the genus Triplophysa.

References

labiata
Taxa named by Karl Kessler
Fish described in 1874